The Men's biathlon relay competition of the Lillehammer 1994 Olympics was held at Birkebeineren Ski Stadium on February 26, 1994. Each national team consisted of four members, with each skiing 7.5 kilometres and shooting twice, once prone and once standing.

Results

References

Men's biathlon at the 1994 Winter Olympics